Mihăileni is a village in Rîșcani District, Moldova.

Notable people
 Valentin Mândâcanu, writer and politician
 Eugenio Coșeriu, linguist

References

Villages of Rîșcani District